Biskra District is a district of Biskra Province, Algeria.

Municipalities
The district has 2 municipalities:
Biskra
El Hadjeb

References

Districts of Biskra Province